Elwendia persica is a plant species in the family Apiaceae. It is related to cumin (Cuminum cyminum) and sometimes called black cumin, blackseed, or black caraway, and has a smoky, earthy taste. It is often confused with Nigella sativa (which is also called black cumin, black caraway, or black seed), by which it is often substituted in cooking.

Dried E. persica fruits are used as a culinary spice in northern India, Pakistan, Bangladesh, Afghanistan, Tajikistan, and Iran.  It is practically unknown outside these areas.

Etymology 

Local names for that spice are kala zeera ( black cumin) or shahi zeera (imperial cumin) in Hindi, as syah zirah (black cumin), kaala zirah (black cumin), and zirah kuhi (mountain/wild cumin) in Urdu, zireh kuhi (wild cumin) in Persian, and siyoh dona (black seed) in Tajiki, and in Malayalam sahajīrakaṁ.

The commonly used Hindi term shahi zeera may be a distortion of syahi (black in Persian) zeera. However, in the Hindustani language, the term syahi also means "inky black". In Bengali, kalo zeera also means black cumin, but refers to Nigella, not E. persica. Nigella is widely used as a spice in Bengali food.

Uses

The plant bears slender, elongate, ribbed fruits which are harvested once the plant has become very dry. Not more than 5 to 8 g can be plucked from each plant, contributing to their high price.

The seeds are most valued as a garnish to high value, very special Indian dishes; they should not be ground, as their flavour would be reduced.

References

External links

Apioideae
Flora of Central Asia
Flora of Western Asia
Flora of the Indian subcontinent
Spices
Indian spices
Taxa named by Pierre Edmond Boissier
Plants described in 1844